Hardyhead refers to a number of species of fish in the family Atherinidae, including:

Dalhousie hardyhead (Craterocephalus dalhousiensis)
Darling River hardyhead (Craterocephalus amniculus)
Drysdale hardyhead (Craterocephalus helenae)
Finke River hardyhead (Craterocephalus centralis)
Fly-specked hardyhead (Craterocephalus stercusmuscarum)
Glover's hardyhead (Craterocephalus gloveri) 
Hardyhead silverside (Atherinomorus lacunosus)
Kailola's hardyhead (Craterocephalus kailolae)
Kutubu hardyhead (Craterocephalus lacustris)
Magela hardyhead (Craterocephalus marianae)
Murray hardyhead (Craterocephalus fluviatilis)
Pima hardyhead (Craterocephalus pimatuae)
Prince Regent hardyhead (Craterocephalus lentiginosus)